The Kazakhstan national under-17 football team is the national under-17 football team of Kazakhstan and is controlled by the Football Federation of Kazakhstan.  The team competes in the annual UEFA European Under-17 Football Championship.

Current squad
 The following players were called up for the 2023 UEFA European Under-17 Championship qualification matches.
 Match dates: 16, 19 and 22 November 2022
 Opposition: ,  and 
 Caps and goals correct as of: 26 September 2022, after the match against

Unofficial squad 2013

|-

! colspan="9"  style="background:#b0d3fb; text-align:left;"|
|- style="background:#dfedfd;"

|-

! colspan="9"  style="background:#b0d3fb; text-align:left;"|
|- style="background:#dfedfd;"

|-
! colspan="9"  style="background:#b0d3fb; text-align:left;"|
|- style="background:#dfedfd;"

Squad for 2015 Kazakhstan President Cup

Latest performances

Friendlies:

23/08/11: Ukraine U17 2–1 Kazakhstan U17
 
24/08/11: Lithuania U17 2–1 Kazakhstan U17

26/08/11: Moldova U17 2–2 Kazakhstan U17

27/08/11: Azerbaijan U17 4–0 Kazakhstan U17

26/09/10: Liechtenstein U17 0–2 Kazakhstan U17

Slovenia 2012 - Qualifying Games:

19/10/11: Czech Republic U17 2–0 Kazakhstan U17

See also
 Kazakhstani graduates of Olé Brasil C.F. (born 1994)

References

under-17
European national under-17 association football teams
Asian national under-17 association football teams